Make Believe is the first album by Platinum Weird. To tie in with the band's back-story, it was marketed as a "lost" album from 1974, with vocals credited to fictional lead singer Erin Grace. In reality, the album was written and recorded in 2005 and 2006, with vocals by Kara DioGuardi. The album features Ringo Starr on two tracks.

In a September 2011 interview, Dave Stewart stated that "the actual Platinum Weird record never actually came out!" Originally, the bonus disc that came in Best Buy copies of the album was the actual album that was supposed to be released. It was out of fun that Stewart and DioGuardi "recorded some versions of these songs as if it was the early ’70s" for a documentary to accompany the fictional back story of the album. Interscope Records sent the wrong collection of songs, the "1974" recordings, out to reviewers to review as the album. This series of events led to the "lost recordings" being released as the album, while the actual Platinum Weird album was never released, except as a rare bonus disc.

Track listing
All songs written by Erin Grace (a.k.a. Kara DioGuardi) and Dave Stewart.

 "Will You Be Around" - 3:32
 "Lonely Eyes" - 3:26
 "Happiness" - 3:33
 "Make Believe" - 3:32
 "Picture Perfect" - 4:06
 "If You Believe in Love" - 3:28
 "Love Can Kill the Blues" - 5:04
 "I Pray" - 3:24
 "Piccadilly Lane" - 3:09
 "Goodbye My Love" - 4:52

Best Buy Bonus Disc Track Listing
"Happiness" - 4:37
"Taking Chances" - 4:04
"Will You Be Around" - 4:01
"Nobody Sees" - 3:38
"Crying At the Disco" - 4:12
"Avalanche" - 4:01
"Somebody to Love" - 3:38
"All My Sorrows" - 4:38
"Love Can Kill the Blues" - 4:25
"Mississippi Valentine" - 4:05
"I Pray" - 4:18
"When We Met" - 2:51

Personnel
Erin Grace (a.k.a. Kara DioGuardi) - vocals
Dave Stewart - guitars, vocals, harmonica
Noel Chambers - organ, piano, mellotron
Matthew Sugarman - bass
Brian Parfitt - drums
Ringo Starr - drums (4, 6)
Michael Addison - audio engineer
Elton John & Steve Brown - executive producers
"Big Al" Lakey - album artwork

Notes 

2006 debut albums
Platinum Weird albums
Albums produced by David A. Stewart